Marta Pustišek (21 February 1917 – 2 August 1966) was a Slovenian gymnast. She competed for Yugoslavia at the women's artistic team all-around event at the 1936 Summer Olympics as well as at the 1938 World Championships where she helped her team to the silver medal.

References

External links
 

1917 births
1966 deaths
Slovenian female artistic gymnasts
Olympic gymnasts of Yugoslavia
Gymnasts at the 1936 Summer Olympics
Sportspeople from Ljubljana
20th-century Slovenian women